The Plains Hotel is a hotel and restaurant in Cheyenne, Wyoming.

It is on the National Register of Historic Places. It is part of the Downtown Cheyenne Historic District.

References

Hotels in Wyoming
Organizations based in Cheyenne, Wyoming